Scoresby may refer to:

People
 William Scoresby (1789–1857), British Arctic explorer, scientist and clergyman
 William F. Scoresby (1840–1884), New York politician
 William Scoresby Routledge (1859–1939), British ethnographer, anthropologist and adventurer

Places
 Scoresby (crater), Lunar crater
 Scoresby Bay, Nunavut, Canada
 Scoresby Hills, Nunavut, Canada
 Scoresby Point, South Georgia
 Scoresby Sound, a fjord in the Eastern coast of Greenland
 Scoresby, Victoria, Australia
 former Electoral district of Scoresby
 William Scoresby Archipelago, Antarctica
 William Scoresby Bay, Antarctica

Ships
 RRS William Scoresby, early 20th century British research vessel
 SS Scoresby (1923–1940), British steam merchant ship

In fiction
 Lee Scoresby, a character in Philip Pullman's His Dark Materials series of books